Kesavarajugari Anjali Sarvani (born 28 July 1997) is an Indian cricketer. She plays for Railways in domestic matches. She made her WT20I debut for India, against Australia, on 9 December 2022.

Career
In 2012, she was selected for India U-19 women's cricket team. She played for Andhra between 2012–13 and 2019–20, before joining Railways. She was recognised as the best bowler when she played for South Zone against North Zone in the 2017–18 Senior Women's Cricket Inter Zonal Three Day Game. She has also been part of the India B cricket team. In 2020, she played for India B in the Women's T20 Quadrangular series in Patna.

References

External links
 
 

1997 births
Living people
Indian women cricketers
India women Twenty20 International cricketers
People from Kurnool
Cricketers from Andhra Pradesh
Andhra women cricketers
Railways women cricketers
UP Warriorz cricketers